José Daniel Rodríguez (born August 29, 1995) is a Venezuelan professional baseball pitcher in the Seattle Mariners organization. He has played in Major League Baseball (MLB) for the Los Angeles Angels.

Career

Los Angeles Angels
Rodríguez signed with the Los Angeles Angels as an international free agent on December 3, 2012. He spent the 2013 season with the DSL Angels, going 3–3 with a 1.64 ERA in 44 innings. He spent the 2014 season with the AZL Angels, going 2–1 with a 4.85 ERA in 26 innings. His 2015 season was spent with the Orem Owlz, going 3–3 with a 4.79 ERA in 62 innings. He spent the 2016 season with the Burlington Bees, going 7–5 with a 3.14 ERA in 131.2 innings. In the 2017 season, he played for the Inland Empire 66ers, going 8–12 with a 5.18 ERA in 149 innings. He spent the 2018 season with the Mobile BayBears, going 7–10 with a 6.12 ERA in 114.2 innings pitched. He opened the 2019 season back with Mobile, before being promoted to the Salt Lake Bees on May 18. 

On July 27, 2019, the Angels selected Rodríguez's contract and promoted him to the major leagues. Rodríguez made his debut that night, throwing  scoreless innings in relief. In  innings for the Angels, he struck out 13 while allowing 11 walks in the process. On December 9, 2019, Rodríguez was outrighted off the Angels roster.

On August 1, 2020, Rodríguez's contract was selected to the 40-man roster. On August 10, he was designated for assignment. On August 15, Rodríguez was outrighted to the alternate training site and elected free agency on October 19, 2020.

Atlanta Braves
On April 21, 2021, Rodríguez signed a minor league contract with the Atlanta Braves organization. Rodríguez split the season between the Triple-A Gwinnett Stripers and the Double-A Mississippi Braves, pitching to a combined 7-7 record and 4.47 ERA in 100.2 innings pitched across 23 appearances. He elected free agency following the season on November 7.

New York Mets
On November 23, 2021, Rodríguez signed a minor league contract with the New York Mets. He elected free agency on November 10, 2022.

Seattle Mariners
On November 22, 2022, Rodríguez signed a minor league contract with the Seattle Mariners.

See also
 List of Major League Baseball players from Venezuela

References

External links

1995 births
Living people
People from Ciudad Bolívar
Venezuelan expatriate baseball players in the United States
Major League Baseball players from Venezuela
Major League Baseball pitchers
Los Angeles Angels players
Dominican Summer League Angels players
Arizona League Angels players
Orem Owlz players
Burlington Bees players
Inland Empire 66ers of San Bernardino players
Mobile BayBears players
Salt Lake Bees players
Venezuelan expatriate baseball players in the Dominican Republic